Babatana, also spelled Mbambatana, is the principal indigenous language of Choiseul Province, Solomon Islands. Although native to the South Choiseul coastline area between Sepa and the Manggo Bay area, the use of this language has spread across much of Choiseul Island and it is generally understood, much like Solomon Islands Pijin, across the province as a second or third language.

Phonology
The following represents the Sisiqa dialect:

Consonants 

 Voiced stops are typically plainly released word-initially, but prenasalized  when intervocalically.
 The fricative  can be heard as an affricate  in free variation within word-initial position.

Vowels 

Simple expressions 
 'Good morning': 
 'Good afternoon': 
 'Good evening': 
 'Good night': 
 'Let's go fishing': 
 'How much': 
 'Many': 
 'No worries': 
 'I'm hungry': 
 'I'm full': 
 'Don't eat it': 
 'I'd like to swim': 
 'I'd like to dive': 
 'I'm going to sleep': 
 'Come here': 
 'Go away': 
 'Bring ... here': 
 'Take ... away': 
 'Leave it': 
 'I like ...': 
 'I see ...': 
 'I don't see ...': 
 'It's too hot': 
 'The sun is too hot': 
 'Where are you going?': 
 'Bad boy':  (usually said in jest with suitable tone)

Commands/verbs 
 'Go': 
 'Come': 
 'Quick': 
 'Slow': 
 'Easy': 
 'Run': 
 'Wait': 
 'Jump': 
 'Out': 
 'Shout': 
 'Tell him':

Numbers 
 1. 
 2. 
 3. 
 4. 
 5. 
 6. 
 7. 
 8. 
 9. 
 10. 
 20. 
 30. 
 40. 
 50. 
 60. 
 70. 
 80. 
 90. 
 100. 
 1000.

Other vocabulary 
 'Food': 
 'Garden': 
 'Cassava': 
 'Pineapple': 
 'Sweet potato': 
 'Taro': 
 'Yam': 
 'Pumpkin': 
 'Corn': 
 'Banana': 
 'Ripe': 
 'Betelnut': 
 'Sour/bitter': 
 'It smells': 
 'Bad smell': 
 'Fish': 
 'Shark': 
 'Bonito': 
 'Crocodile': 
 'Kingfish': 
 'Barracuda': 
 'Marlin': 
 'Fishing line': 
 'Hook': 
 'Bait': 
 'Reef': 
 'Dive': 
 'Coral': 
 'Sea cucumber': 
 'Clam shell': 
 'Shell': 
 'River': 
 'Rain': 
 'Wind': 
 'Cyclone': 
 'Sea': 
 'Fresh water': 
 'Island': 
 'Mountain': 
 'Sand beach': 
 'Sky': 
 'Cloud': 
 'Sun': 
 'Star': 
 'Moon': 
 'Canoe': 
 'Paddle': 
 'House': 
 'Ladder': 
 'Kitchen': 
 'Cooking pot': 
 'Door': 
 'Window': 
 'Sleep': 
 'Mosquito':

Customary terms 
 'Creep':

Colourful words 
 'Masturbation': 
 'Excrement': 
 'Vagina': 
 'Penis': 
 'Anus': 
 'Mucus':

References

External links 

 Babatana wordlist

Languages of the Solomon Islands
Northwest Solomonic languages